The University of Silesia in Katowice is an autonomous state-run university in Silesia Province, Katowice, Poland.

The university offers higher education and research facilities. It offers undergraduate, masters, and PhD degree programs, as well as postgraduate, postdoctoral research, habilitation, and continuous education and training programs.

History 

The history of the University of Silesia in Katowice dates back to 1928, when the Instytut Pedagogiczny w Katowicach (Pedagogical Institute in Katowice) was established in Katowice which existed till 1939. In 1950, the Higher Pedagogical School in Katowice was established, however, first preparations to formation of what would later become the University of Silesia in Katowice were taken just after the end of Second World War.

In June 1962, a branch of Jagiellonian University was settled in Katowice, which concentrated, apart from humanities, on mathematics, physics and law. Together with the Higher Pedagogical School in Katowice, these are the foundations of what came to life on June 8, 1968, as the University of Silesia in Katowice. And so on October 1, 1968, the University (composed of four faculties) had its first academic year inaugurated, providing almost 6,000 students with twelve programmes, such as philology, pedagogics, psychology, history, law, administration, mathematics, physics, chemistry, physical education, electrotechnics and mechanics. Three years later, the branch of the University in Cieszyn was established, and in following years (1974-1978) six new faculties were opened. In the years of 2002 and 2003, last two faculties were established, which had their roots in a reformed branch of the University in Cieszyn.

Location 

Uniwersytet Śląski w Katowicach has facilities in four cities in the region: Katowice, Sosnowiec, Cieszyn and Chorzów. The majority of facilities are in Katowice; the main campus is in the city center.

The university is in the center of a highly urbanized and ethnically complex region, the Metropolitan Association of Upper Silesia. Heavy industry is a significant influence, and ecological challenges are formidable. The university tries to maintain close links with local industries and Silesian traditions.

Facts and figures  
Number of teachers: 2,082
Number of students: 27,395
Number of faculties: 8 (since 2019)
Number of programmes: 71
Number of specializations: 234

International agreements 
The University of Silesia has signed over 600 bilateral agreements with partner institutions in countries all over the world. Among the others University of Silesia cooperates  with: Saint Petersburg State University, University of Buenos Aires, University of Alberta, Beijing Foreign Studies University, Tokyo University of Foreign Studies and in the frame of programme Erasmus+ with: University of Vienna, University of Helsinki, Charles University in Prague, University of Birmingham, University of Strasbourg, University of Bologna, Sapienza University of Rome, University of Verona, University of Lisbon, Stockholm University, University of Oslo, Paris-Sorbonne University, University of Zurich, University of Valencia, University of Barcelona.

Faculties

The University of Silesia in Katowice has schools of modern languages, natural science, and technology, and a language teacher training college.

It is divided into the following faculties:

 Faculty of Humanities

 Faculty of Natural Sciences

 Faculty of Social Sciences

 Faculty of Science and Technology

 Faculty of Law and Administration

 Faculty of Arts and Education Sciences

 Faculty of Theology
Krzysztof Kieślowski Film School

Rectors 
prof. dr hab. Kazimierz Popiołek (1968-07-02 – 1972-09-30)
prof. dr hab. Henryk Rechowicz (1972-10-01 – 1980-07-05)
prof. dr hab. Sędzimir Klimaszewski (1980-12-05 – 1980-12-15, 1980-12-16 – 1981-09-30, 1982-06-01 – 1984-09-30, 1984-10-01 – 1987-09-30, 1987-10-01 – 1990-11-30)
prof. dr hab. August Chełkowski (1981-10-01 – 1982-01-16)
prof. dr hab. Maksymilian Pazdan (1990-12-01 – 1993-08-31, 1993-09-01 – 1996-08-31)
prof. dr hab. Tadeusz Sławek (1996-09-01 – 1999-08-31, 1999-09-01 – 2002-08-31)
prof. dr hab. Janusz Janeczek(2002-09-01 – 2005-08-31, 2005-09-01 – 2008-08-31)
prof. dr hab. Wiesław Banyś (2008-09-01 – 2012-08-31, 2012-09-01 – 2016-08-31)
prof. dr hab. Andrzej Kowalczyk 
 prof. dr hab. Ryszard Koziołek

Libraries

Scientific Information Centre and Academic Library (Polish Acronym: CINiBA), opened in 2012, is a modern scientific library open for students and researchers, but also people unrelated to university or academic activities. Being a joint project of the University of Silesia and University of Economics in Katowice, most of the materials are freely available in the open space to which users have free access. The library is equipped with modern technologies and information tools, and is adapted to meet the expectations people with disabilities.

In 2015 it was nominated for European Union Prize for Contemporary Architecture award.

Rankings 

In 2017, Times Higher Education ranked the university within the 801-1000 band globally.

Notable professors

Krzysztof Kieślowski (1941–1996), film director and screenwriter
Krzysztof Zanussi (born 1939), film and theatre director, producer and screenwriter
Jerzy Stuhr (born 1947), film and theatre actor
Andrzej Fidyk (born 1953), documentary filmmaker
Marcin Koszałka (born 1970), cinematographer and film director
Eugenia Mandal, psychologist
Marcin Wrona (1973–2015), film director
Filip Bajon (born 1947), film director and screenwriter
Marek Kuczma (1935–1991), mathematician
August Chełkowski (1927–1999), physicist and politician
Jan Mikusiński (1913–1987), mathematician
Jerzy Gorzelik (born 1971), politician and art historian

Notable students
Urszula Antoniak (born 1968), film director
Tomasz Beksiński (1958–1999), radio presenter and journalist
Krystyna Bochenek (1953–2010), politician, former  Vice-Marshal of the Senate of the Republic of Poland 
Mateusz Bochenek (1993), politician
Borys Budka (1978), politician, former leader of the Civic Platform political party
Paweł Czarnota (born 1988), chess grandmaster
Jan Drabina (born 1939), historian
Anita Gargas (born 1964), journalist
Tomasz Kamusella (1967), scholar
Maciej Konieczny (1980), politician
Ataullah Bogdan Kopański (born 1948), historian
Grzegorz Lach (born 1967), historian
Tadeusz Lubelski (1949), film historian, theorist and critic
Henryka Mościcka-Dendys (born 1976), diplomat 
Idzi Panic (born 1952), historian
Magdalena Piekorz (born 1974), film director, screenwriter, winner of the Golden Lions at the 29th Gdynia Film Festival
Renata Przemyk (born 1966), singer
Stsiapan Putsila (born 1998), Belarussian journalist, blogger and film director, founder of the media outlet Nexta
Michał Rosa (born 1963), film director
Tomasz Sapota (born 1970), classical philologist
Sławomir Skrzypek (1963–2010), economist, former President of the National Bank of Poland
Jan Sładkowski (born 1958), physicist
Andrzej Swierniak (born 1950), mathematician
Konrad Szołajski (born 1956), film director
Maciej Ślesicki (born 1966), film director
Szczepan Twardoch (born 1979), writer
Gertruda Uścińska (born 1958), lawyer and political scientist
Piotr Wilczek (born 1962), historian
Natalia Zamilska, (born 1989), composer, DJ and music producer 
Tadeusz Zieliński (1966), theologian

See also
List of universities in Poland
University of Silesia (Czech Republic)

References

External links 

 University of Silesia in Katowice - website
 Uniwersytet Śląski w Katowicach - website

 
Universities and colleges in Katowice
Educational institutions established in 1968
1968 establishments in Poland
Film schools in Poland